Kurilsky District is an administrative district (raion) of Sakhalin Oblast, Russia; one of the seventeen in the oblast. Municipally, it is incorporated as Kurilsky Urban Okrug. It is located on the central Kuril Islands southeast of the Island of Sakhalin. Its administrative center is the town of Kurilsk. Population:  The population of Kurilsk accounts for 28.1% of the district's total population. The name is sometimes spelled Kurliskiy or Kurliskiye in English.

References

Notes

Sources

Districts of Sakhalin Oblast